The 61st Annual Primetime Creative Arts Emmy Awards ceremony was held on September 12, 2009 at the Nokia Theatre in Downtown Los Angeles. This was in conjunction with the annual Primetime Emmy Awards and was presented in recognition of technical and other similar achievements in American television programming. The ceremony was hosted by American comedian Kathy Griffin and was broadcast by E!.

Winners and nominees
Winners are listed first and highlighted in bold:

Programs

Acting

Animation

Art Direction

Casting

Choreography

Cinematography

Commercial

Costuming

Directing

Hairstyling

Interactive Media

Lighting Design / Direction

Main Title Design

Makeup

Music

Picture Editing

Sound

Special Visual Effects

Stunt Coordination

Technical Direction

Writing

References

External links
 Academy of Television Arts and Sciences website

061 Creative Arts
2009 television awards
2009 in Los Angeles
September 2009 events in the United States